The Carnegie Library in Dublin, Georgia is a building built in 1904.  The funding for the building was provided largely by the philanthropist Andrew Carnegie who offered $10,000 as part of his educational program. The architectural company of Bruce, Morgan, and Dillon designed the building, and John A. Kelley was contacted for the construction.

The building was listed on the National Register of Historic Places in 1975. From 1904 to the 1960s it was used as the central library for the City of Dublin. From the 1970s through 2014, the building was home to the Laurens County Historical Society and Museum. It is currently used as a special event space and art gallery managed by the Dublin Downtown Development Authority.

It is included as a contributing building in the Dublin Commercial Historic District, National Register-listed in 2002.

References

Library buildings completed in 1904
Libraries on the National Register of Historic Places in Georgia (U.S. state)
Buildings and structures in Laurens County, Georgia
National Register of Historic Places in Laurens County, Georgia
Historic district contributing properties in Georgia (U.S. state)
Carnegie libraries in Georgia (U.S. state)